Paul Ansel Chadbourne (October 21, 1823 – February 23, 1883) was an American educator and naturalist who served as President of University of Wisconsin from 1867 to 1870, and President of Williams College from 1872 until his resignation in 1881. He was also the second President of the Massachusetts Agricultural College (later University of Massachusetts) in 1867 and again from 1882 until his death in 1883.

Early life
Chadbourne was born in North Berwick, Maine, and attended school at Phillips Exeter Academy. He graduated from Williams College, where he was a member of The Kappa Alpha Society, and became valedictorian in 1848 with Phi Beta Kappa honors. Chadbourne earned his M.D. degree from Berkshire Medical College but never practiced medicine.

Career
Chadbourne initially taught school in Freehold, New Jersey, until taking a position at Williams College, where he taught scientific subjects for fourteen years. At Williams College he was the Professor of Chemistry, Botany, and Natural History. Concurrently, he was professor at Bowdoin College, Maine Medical College, and Berkshire Medical School.

He was President of the Massachusetts Agricultural College from 1866 to 1867, and from 1882 to 1883. He was the President and Professor of Metaphysics at the University of Wisconsin at Madison from 1867 to 1870.

Chadbourne served as a member of the Republican party in the Massachusetts Senate from 1865 to 1866.

Death and legacy
Following years of pulmonary problems, Chadbourne died on February 23, 1883, while serving as President of the Massachusetts Agricultural College.

Chadbourne House at Williams College is named after him.

Chadbourne Hall at the University of Wisconsin-Madison is named after him.

Selected works
Lectures on Natural History (1860)
The Influence of History on Individual and National Action; Annual Address before the State Historical Society of Wisconsin (1868)
Lectures on Natural Theology (1869)
Inaugural Address (1872)
Strength of Men and Stability of Nations; Baccalaureate Discourses (1873-1877)
Strength of the Inward Man (1873)
Him That Overcometh (1874)
The Law of Service (1875)
The Tree by the Rivers of Water (1876)
The Stability of Nations (1877)
The Hope of the Righteous (1877)
Instinct: Its Office in the Animal Kingdom, and Its Relation to the Higher Powers in Man (1883)

References

External links
 
Paul A. Chadbourne papers via Williams College
Biographical note via Williams College
Wisconsin Historical Society: Chadbourne, Paul Ansel 1823 - 1883
The University of Wisconsin Madison: Chancellors and Presidents of the University of Wisconsin-Madison

1823 births
1883 deaths
American naturalists
Leaders of the University of Massachusetts Amherst
Presidents of Williams College
Leaders of the University of Wisconsin-Madison
Massachusetts state senators
People from North Berwick, Maine
Writers from Maine
Writers from Massachusetts
Writers from Wisconsin
Berkshire Medical College alumni
19th-century American politicians
Williams College alumni